The Provincial Deputation was created by the Spanish Constitution of 1812 to provide a representation of the territorial division of Spain and the American dominions of the Spanish monarchy during the term Cortes of Cádiz. The Cortes created new structures for home rule, the provincial deputations and the constitutional ayuntamientos (local governments). The provincial deputations were a way by which regions ruled by juntas and areas in rebellion in the Americas could keep local control, but maintain their ties to the larger Spanish Empire.

The term "province" in America had an imprecise meaning. The American deputies with the word referred to the small province (Partido), while the European deputies did with great province (kingdom, viceroyalty). The Spanish courts identified province with Intendancy. Previously, the decree of the Supreme Central Junta defined the American territories not as colonies, but as an integral part of the Hispanic Monarchy.

With the constitution and the creation of provincial deputations, the Cortes abolished the viceroyalties; the provincial deputations dealt directly with the government in Spain. The province was governed by a Jefe Político (political chief) appointed by the central government, and a seven-member Diputación Provincial (provincial council), popularly elected. With the absolutist restoration in Spain in 1814 and 1823, the provinces as political entities disappeared and their territories were again included in the restored viceroyalties. However, by 1825 all but Cuba, Puerto Rico, and the Philippines remained of The Indies, following the Spanish American wars of independence.

American Provinces of Spain under the Spanish Constitution of 1812 
A commission of American deputies subsequently presented its opinion on May 1, 1812, to have the number of American provinces described in the Spanish Constitution of 1812 raised to twenty. This was approved by the Cortes. Later, the American deputies demanded an even greater subdivision, and after the installation of the Trienio Liberal in 1820, the Spanish Cortes agreed in their decree of May 9, 1821, to convert all intendancies into provinces. However, these provinces were merely nominal, since many of the territories were part of the new independent Spanish-American states. In any case, all the provinces were directly dependent on Madrid, autonomous and without any institutional relationship among themselves. The province was subdivided into partidos, governed by Jefes Políticos Subalternos (sub-level political chief).

See also 
Cortes of Cádiz
Spanish Constitution of 1812
National sovereignty
Liberalism

References

Bibliography
Berry, Charles R. "The Election of Mexican Deputies to the Spanish Cortes, 1810-1822", in Mexico and the Spanish Cortes, 1810-1822, Nettie Lee Benson, ed. University of Texas Press 1971, pp. 10-42.
Rieu-Millan, Marie Laure. Los diputatods americanos en las Cortes de Cádiz. Madrid: Consejo Superior de Investigaciones Científicas, 1990.
Municipios y provincias: historia de la organización territorial española

Spanish colonization of the Americas